Yoo Hyun-young (born 3 January 1990) is a badminton player from South Korea. Her first big result internationally came when, at the age of 16, she partnered Lee Yong-dae to win the mixed doubles title at the 2006 BWF World Junior Championships, as well as the mixed team title. She was a team-mate of both Bae Yeon-ju and Jung Kyung-eun at Masan's Sungji Girls' High School and in 2007, all three girls were runners-up at the 2007 BWF World Junior Championships.

After graduating to the senior ranks, Yoo continued to play with both Jung and Shin Baek-cheol, her partner in her last year of junior play. She and Shin were mixed doubles runners-up at the 2010 Swiss Open Super Series. Later that year, she and Jung won their first Grand Prix title, the Korea Grand Prix. However, shortly afterward, both pairings were split up.

Yoo, Bae Yeon-ju, Jung Kyung-eun, and Bae Seung-hee, among others, were coached by Yoo's father Yoo Gap-soo both at Sungji Girls' High School and later at Korea Ginseng Corporation.

Achievements

BWF World Junior Championships 
Girls' doubles

Mixed doubles

Asian Junior Championships 
Girls' doubles

Mixed doubles

BWF Superseries 
The BWF Superseries, which was launched on 14 December 2006 and implemented in 2007, was a series of elite badminton tournaments, sanctioned by the Badminton World Federation (BWF). BWF Superseries levels were Superseries and Superseries Premier. A season of Superseries consisted of twelve tournaments around the world that had been introduced since 2011. Successful players were invited to the Superseries Finals, which were held at the end of each year.

Mixed doubles

  BWF Superseries Finals tournament
  BWF Superseries Premier tournament
  BWF Superseries tournament

BWF Grand Prix 
The BWF Grand Prix had two levels, the Grand Prix and Grand Prix Gold. It was a series of badminton tournaments sanctioned by the Badminton World Federation (BWF) and played between 2007 and 2017.

Women's doubles

Mixed doubles

  BWF Grand Prix Gold tournament
  BWF Grand Prix tournament

BWF International Challenge/Series 
Women's doubles

Mixed doubles

  BWF International Challenge tournament
  BWF International Series tournament

References 

1990 births
Living people
South Korean female badminton players
Badminton players at the 2010 Asian Games
Asian Games bronze medalists for South Korea
Asian Games medalists in badminton
Medalists at the 2010 Asian Games